The Poland women's national under-20 volleyball team represents Poland in international women's volleyball competitions and friendly matches under the age 20 and it is ruled by the Polish Volleyball Federation That is an affiliate of Federation of International Volleyball FIVB and also a part of European Volleyball Confederation CEV.

Results

FIVB U20 World Championship
 Champions   Runners up   Third place   Fourth place

Europe U19 Championship
 Champions   Runners up   Third place   Fourth place

Team

Current squad

The following is the Polish roster for the 2019 FIVB Volleyball Women's U20 World Championship.

Head coach: Waldemar Kawka

See also
Poland women's team
Poland women's U18 team
Poland women's U20 team
Poland women's U23 team
Poland men's team

References

External links
Official website 
FIVB profile

 

National women's under-20 volleyball teams
Volleyball
Volleyball in Poland